Yuri Ivanovich Manin (16 February 1937 – 7 January 2023) was a Russian mathematician, known for work in algebraic geometry and diophantine geometry, and many expository works ranging from mathematical logic to theoretical physics.

Life and career 
Manin was born on 16 February 1937 in Simferopol, Crimean ASSR, Soviet Union.

He received a doctorate in 1960 at the Steklov Mathematics Institute as a student of Igor Shafarevich. He became a professor at the Max-Planck-Institut für Mathematik in Bonn, where he was director from 1992 to 2005 and then director emeritus. He was also a professor emeritus at Northwestern University.

He had over the years more than 40 doctoral students, including Vladimir Berkovich, Mariusz Wodzicki, Alexander Beilinson, Ivan Cherednik, Alexei Skorobogatov, Vladimir Drinfeld, Mikhail Kapranov, Vyacheslav Shokurov, Arend Bayer, Victor Kolyvagin and Hà Huy Khoái.

Manin died on 7 January 2023.

Research 
Manin's early work included papers on the arithmetic and formal groups of abelian varieties, the Mordell conjecture in the function field case, and algebraic differential equations. The Gauss–Manin connection is a basic ingredient of the study of cohomology in families of algebraic varieties.

He developed the Manin obstruction, indicating the role of the Brauer group in accounting for obstructions to the Hasse principle via Grothendieck's theory of global Azumaya algebras, setting off a generation of further work.

Manin pioneered the field of arithmetic topology (along with John Tate, David Mumford, Michael Artin, and Barry Mazur). He also formulated the Manin conjecture, which predicts the asymptotic behaviour of the number of rational points of bounded height on algebraic varieties.

In mathematical physics, Manin wrote on Yang–Mills theory, quantum information, and mirror symmetry. He was one of the first to propose the idea of a quantum computer in 1980 with his book Computable and Uncomputable.

He wrote a book on cubic surfaces and cubic forms, showing how to apply both classical and contemporary methods of algebraic geometry, as well as nonassociative algebra.

Awards 
He was awarded the Brouwer Medal in 1987, the first Nemmers Prize in Mathematics in 1994, the Schock Prize of the Royal Swedish Academy of Sciences in 1999, the Cantor Medal of the German Mathematical Society in 2002, the King Faisal International Prize in 2002, and the Bolyai Prize of the Hungarian Academy of Sciences in 2010.

In 1990, he became a foreign member of the Royal Netherlands Academy of Arts and Sciences. He was a member of eight other academies of science and was also an honorary member of the London Mathematical Society.

Selected works 

 
 
 

 
 
 
 
 
 , second expanded edition with new chapters by the author and Boris Zilber, Springer 2010.

See also 
 ADHM construction
 Cartier-Manin operator
 CH-quasigroup
 Dieudonné–Manin classification theorem
 Modular symbol
 Manin–Drinfeld theorem
 Manin matrices
 Manin obstruction
 Manin triple

References

Further reading

External links 

 Manin's page at Max-Planck-Institut für Mathematik website
 Good Proofs are Proofs that Make us Wiser, interview by Martin Aigner and Vasco A. Schmidt
 Biography
 Interviewed by David Eisenbud for Simons Foundation "Science Lives"

1937 births
2023 deaths
Scientists from Simferopol
Algebraic geometers
Algebraists
Moscow State University alumni
Northwestern University faculty
Massachusetts Institute of Technology faculty
Members of Academia Europaea
Members of the German Academy of Sciences Leopoldina
Members of the Göttingen Academy of Sciences and Humanities
Members of the Pontifical Academy of Sciences
Members of the French Academy of Sciences
Members of the Royal Netherlands Academy of Arts and Sciences
Corresponding Members of the USSR Academy of Sciences
Corresponding Members of the Russian Academy of Sciences
Rolf Schock Prize laureates
Brouwer Medalists
Soviet mathematicians
21st-century Russian mathematicians
20th-century Russian mathematicians
Lenin Prize winners
Knights Commander of the Order of Merit of the Federal Republic of Germany
Recipients of the Pour le Mérite (civil class)
Quantum information scientists
Max Planck Institute directors